Nalwa Assembly constituency in Hisar district is one of the 90 Vidhan Sabha constituencies of Haryana state in northern India.

History
Nalwa became a new Assembly constituency of Legislative Assembly of Haryana in the state of Haryana in the 2008 delimitation exercise. Earlier, most of the villages of this constituency were under Adampur, a stronghold of Bhajan Lal. Some of the villages were earlier with the Bawani Khera Constituency.

Overview
Nalwa is part of Hisar Lok Sabha constituency along with eight other Assembly segments, namely, Uchana in Jind district and Adampur, Uklana, Narnaund, Hansi, Barwala, Hisar and Bawani Khera in Hisar district.

Members of the Assembly

Election results

2019 
In 2019, Ranbir Singh Gangwa of Bharatiya Janata Party won the seat by defeating Randhir Panihar from Indian National Congress with a margin of 9672 votes.

2014 
Ranbir Singh Gangwa Prajapati of Indian National Lok Dal won the 2014 Haryana Legislative Assembly election on 19 October 2014. He is an ex member of parliament and a senior leader of Indian national Lokdal party. He defeated ex finance minister and sitting MLA professor Sampat Singh and ex deputy chief minister of Haryana shri Chandermohan Bishnoi with a margin of 7100 votes.

2009 
Nalwa constituency was represented by an ex-minister of Haryana and senior Congress leader of the Haryana State Assembly, Professor Sampat Singh. He won the October 2009 elections with a margin of 10,901 votes, defeating Jasma Devi of the Haryana Janhit Congress. Jasma Devi is the wife of Bhajan Lal and this was the first defeat of the Bhajanlal clan in Haryana state politics. This defeat led to the downfall of Bhajanlal's Haryana Janhit Congress in literal terms for just after winning, five out of total six MLAs of Haryana Janhit Congress left the HJC and joined the Congress.

See also
 Nalwa

References

Assembly constituencies of Haryana
Hisar district